The Ibanag (also Ybanag and Ybanak or Ibanak) are an ethnolinguistic minority numbering a little more than half a million people, who inhabit the provinces of Cagayan, Isabela, and Nueva Vizcaya. They are one of the largest ethnolinguistic minorities in the Philippines.

Etymology
The endonym "Ibanag" comes from the prefix I- which means "people of", and bannag, meaning river. This toponym-based name is similar to the unrelated etymology for the Tagalog people, which is derived from taga- ("person from") and ilog ("river")

Language

The Ibanag language (also Ybanag) is spoken by about 500,000 speakers in two of the northeasternmost provinces of the Philippines, Isabela, and Cagayan. It is closely related to Gaddang, Itawis, Agta, Atta, Yogad, Isneg, and Malaweg.

It is spoken especially in Tuguegarao City, Solana, Cabagan, San Pablo, Tumauini, Sta. Maria, Sto. Tomas, Ilagan, Gamu, Naguilian, and Reina Mercedes, San Mariano, Isabela. There are also several speakers of the Ibanag language in Abulug, Aparri, Camalaniugan, Lal-lo, and Tuao. Most of the speakers can speak Ilocano, the lingua franca of Northern Luzon, as well.

Displacement
Ibanags speak the same language under the same name. However, due to several factors including the use of Filipino as the national lingua franca and Ilocano as a regional one, the use of Ibanag language has now diminished but remains strong with Ibanags living overseas. Thus while there may still be Ibanags around, the language is slowly being displaced. In addition to this, many if not most Ibanags speak Ilocano, which has over the years, supplanted Ibanag as the more dominant language in the region.

References

External links
Bansa.org Ibanag Dictionary 

Ethnic groups in Luzon